Fagan Guluzada (born 14 March 1993) is an Azerbaijani judoka.

He is the bronze medallist of the 2017 Judo Grand Prix Tashkent in the -81 kg category.

References

External links
 

1995 births
Living people
Azerbaijani male judoka
20th-century Azerbaijani people
21st-century Azerbaijani people